Angela Yeung Wing (born 28 February 1989), better known by her stage name Angelababy, is a Hong Kong actress, businesswoman, investor, model, and singer. In 2013, she was chosen by Southern Metropolis Daily as one of the New Four Dan Actresses. In 2016, she won the Hundred Flowers Award for Best Supporting Actress for her role in the blockbuster film Mojin: The Lost Legend. She is a cast member of variety show Keep Running.

Early life 
Angelababy was born in Shanghai, China to a Shanghainese mother and a father from Hong Kong, who is of half German and half Chinese descent. Her birth name is Yang Ying (Cantonese: Yeung Wing). Her father runs a fashion business in Shanghai. She gained an interest in fashion as a child under her father's influence. She said in an interview, "Even though he [her father] sells more mature clothes, I loved going to his store and trying on new outfits and mixing and matching them. It was fun. I think that's how I developed a passion for fashion".

Yang moved to Hong Kong when she was thirteen, and signed a modelling contract with Style International Management at the age of 14. Although her English name is Angela, she was sometimes called "Baby" during her primary and secondary school years. She combined these two names to form her stage name, Angelababy. She speaks English, Mandarin, Shanghainese, Cantonese and Japanese.

Career

2007–2012: Beginnings
Angelababy debuted as an actress in the movie Trivial Matters in 2007, where she had a 5-minute cameo appearance in the film. She then starred in numerous films as supporting roles, as well as appearing in music videos. Angelababy had her first leading role in the 2011 film Love You You alongside Eddie Peng. She sang a duet with JJ Lin entitled "Bottom of the Heart" as part of the movie's soundtrack.

In 2012, Angelababy starred alongside Mark Chao in romance film First Time, a remake of the 2003 Korean film ...ing. Her performance in First Time won her the Most Anticipated Actress award at the 13th Chinese Film Media Awards. She then starred in both instalments of wuxia film Tai Chi, portraying a martial artist.

2013–2014: Rising popularity
In 2013, Angelababy starred in Tsui Hark's crime action film Young Detective Dee: Rise of the Sea Dragon, playing a beautiful courtesan. She won the Most Popular Actress award at the 21st Beijing College Student Film Festival for the film.

In 2014, Angelababy joined the cast of Keep Running, a spin-off from the South Korean variety program Running Man. The series was a major hit in China, and propelled Angelababy into a household name. The same year, she starred alongside fellow Keep Running member Michael Chen in romance film Love on the Cloud, which was a moderate success at the box office. Angelababy was crowned "Weibo Goddess" and "Weibo Queen" for the year 2014.

2015–present: International appearance and TV roles
Angelababy made her Hollywood film debut in Hitman: Agent 47 with a minor role. She then starred in Mojin: The Lost Legend, based on the popular tomb raiding novel series Ghost Blows Out the Light. Angelababy won the Best Supporting Actress award at the 33rd Hundred Flowers Awards for her role, but was criticised for her mediocre acting and lackluster performance. The same year, she starred in her first television series, historical drama Love Yunge from the Desert based on Tong Hua's novel Song in the Clouds.

In 2016, Angelababy played a major supporting role in the Hollywood science fiction film Independence Day: Resurgence. The same year, she was listed as one of Forbes' inaugural 30 under 30 Asian Celebrities under the film, music, television and sport category.

In 2017, Angelababy starred alongside Wallace Chung in the historical drama General and I. Although the drama was a commercial success, she received criticism for her acting and for using stunt doubles.

In 2018, she starred in the modern workplace drama Entrepreneurial Age alongside Huang Xuan.

In 2019, Angelababy starred in the modern drama My True Friend as a property agent alongside Deng Lun. 

In 2021, Angelababy was cast in the drama Twilight alongside Ren Jialun.

Personal life 
Angelababy had been dating Chinese actor Huang Xiaoming, who is 12 years her senior, for six years, but their relationship was not revealed to the public until February 2014. On 27 May 2015, they obtained their marriage certificate in Qingdao, China and their wedding banquet took place in Shanghai on 8 October 2015. The wedding banquet was reported to be one of the most lavish in China's history with a reported estimate of US$31 million.

In October 2016, Huang and Angelababy announced her pregnancy. She gave birth to their son on 11 January 2017 at the Hong Kong Adventist Hospital.

She has over a hundred million followers on Weibo as of June 2021, making her one of the most widely followed celebrities on the Chinese microblogging platform.

On January 28, 2022, Huang and Angelababy announced their divorce.

Business and philanthropy 
Angelababy has invested in several businesses; including a nail parlour, a café (with fellow Hong Kong actor Tony Leung Ka-fai) and a lifestyle store.

In 2015, she set up her own venture capital fund, AB Capital. She then bought shares in Chinese overseas purchasing e-commerce site Ymatou and beverage brand HeyJuice.

In 2016, Angelababy entered the Hurun Philanthropy List, the youngest to be included. She and husband Huang Xiaoming donated US$2.6 million to a charity program initiated by Huang to help university graduates start a business or seek employment.

In 2020, Angelababy and Huang Xiaoming donated CN¥200,000 to hospital relief efforts related to the 2019–20 coronavirus pandemic in Hubei.

In 2021, Angelababy invested in an entertainment company, Cool Style, which was set up by Media Asia and Louis Koo's One Cool Group.  Cool Style's business scope includes artist management and related businesses aiming to cultivate new forces with abundant resources and platforms.

In March 2021, Angelababy expressed her support for cotton from Xinjiang, after several companies stopped purchasing the cotton due to concerns about human rights violations.

Filmography

Film

Television series

Variety show

Discography

Singles

Awards and nominations

Forbes China Celebrity 100

References

External links 

 
 Angelababy on Sina Weibo

1989 births
Living people
21st-century Chinese actresses
21st-century Chinese women singers
21st-century Hong Kong actresses
Actresses from Shanghai
Avex Group talents
Businesspeople from Shanghai
Businesspeople in coffee
Businesspeople in the drink industry
Chinese emigrants to Hong Kong
Chinese female models
Chinese film actresses
Chinese people of German descent
Chinese television actresses
Chinese venture capitalists
Hong Kong female models
Hong Kong investors
Hong Kong philanthropists
Hong Kong voice actresses
Hong Kong women in business
People with acquired residency of Hong Kong